Hodgson Nunatak is a nunatak which lies  south of Teeters Nunatak and  northwest of Mount Moses in the Hudson Mountains of Antarctica. It was mapped by the United States Geological Survey from surveys and U.S. Navy air photos, 1960–66, and named by the Advisory Committee on Antarctic Names for Ronald A. Hodgson, U.S. Navy, a builder with the Byrd Station party, 1966.

References

Hudson Mountains
Nunataks of Ellsworth Land
Volcanoes of Ellsworth Land